Kelly Canyon is an alpine ski area in eastern Idaho, in the Targhee National Forest.  Northeast of Idaho Falls, it straddles the county line in the southeastern corner of Jefferson County and also in southern Madison County. The ski area opened in 1957, founded by E. Bud Johnson.

Lift service includes four double chairlifts and a rope tow on the north-facing slopes. The terrain is rated at 35% easiest, 45% more difficult, and 20% most difficult.

The ski area is open seven days a week.  

Kelly Canyon also has Nordic skiing and snowshoeing trails, just beyond the alpine lifts. The snowshoe trails are designated with Atlas Snowshoe markers for easy navigation.

References

External links
kellycanyonresort.com - official site
Idaho Winter.com - official state tourism site - Kelly Canyon
Idaho Ski Resorts.com - Kelly Canyon
Ski Map.org – trail maps – Kelly Canyon
Nordic & Snowshoe trails

Ski areas and resorts in Idaho
Buildings and structures in Jefferson County, Idaho
Buildings and structures in Madison County, Idaho
Tourist attractions in Jefferson County, Idaho
Tourist attractions in Madison County, Idaho
1957 establishments in Idaho